The 2021–22 Kaohsiung Aquas season was the franchise's 1st season, its first season in the T1 League, its 1st in Kaohsiung City. The Aquas are coached by Brendan Joyce in his first year as head coach.

Draft 

 Reference：

The Aquas' 2021 first-round draft pick was traded to New Taipei CTBC DEA in exchange for cash considerations.

Standings 

With a victory against the Taoyuan Leopards on April 17, 2022, the Aquas clinched the league's best record for the 2021–22 season.

Roster 

<noinclude>

Game log

Preseason

Regular season

Regular season note 
 Due to the COVID-19 pandemic in Taoyuan, the Taoyuan City Government and Taoyuan Leopards declared that the games at the Chung Yuan Christian University Gymnasium would play behind closed doors since January 15 to 16.
 Due to the COVID-19 pandemic preventive measures of Taipei City Government, the T1 League declared that the game on January 23 would postpone to May 8.
 Due to the COVID-19 pandemic in Taiwan, the T1 League declared that the game on February 5 would postpone to May 1. And the games at the Kaohsiung Arena would play behind closed doors since January 28 to 30.
 Due to the COVID-19 pandemic in Taiwan, the T1 League declared that the game on February 20 would postpone to March 11.
 Due to the TaiwanBeer HeroBears cannot reach the minimum player number, the T1 League declared that the game on May 8 would postpone to May 20.

Semifinals

Finals

Player Statistics 
<noinclude>

Regular season

Semifinals

Finals

 Reference：

Transactions

From Kaohsiung Jeoutai Technology

Free agents

Additions

Awards

Yearly Awards

Finals Awards

Import of the Month

References 

2021–22 T1 League season by team
Kaohsiung Aquas seasons